Userland may refer to:

 Radio UserLand, a computer program to aid maintaining blogs or podcasts
 UserLand Software, a U.S. software company specializing in web applications
 UserLAnd Technologies, a mobile app that allows Linux programs to run on mobile devices
 User space, operating system software that does not belong in the kernel